Gyula Kellner (born April 11, 1871 in Budapest, Kingdom of Hungary; died July 28, 1940 in Szolnok, Kingdom of Hungary) was a Hungarian athlete. He competed at the 1896 Summer Olympics in Athens.

Kellner was one of 17 athletes to start the marathon race (the first modern Olympic marathon).  He finished in fourth place, but when the third-place finisher, Spiridon Belokas, was found to have covered a portion of the race by carriage, Kellner was awarded third place.  His time was 3:06.35.

References

External links

1871 births
1940 deaths
Athletes from Budapest
Hungarian male marathon runners
Hungarian male long-distance runners
Olympic athletes of Hungary
Athletes (track and field) at the 1896 Summer Olympics
19th-century sportsmen
Olympic bronze medalists for Hungary
Medalists at the 1896 Summer Olympics
Olympic bronze medalists in athletics (track and field)